Solly is a given name, nickname (often of Solomon) and a surname. It may refer to:

Given name
 Solly Granatstein, American television producer
 Solly Krieger (1909–1964), American world champion middleweight boxer
 Solly Pernick, American stage technician
 Solly Shoke (born 1956), South African general

Nickname
 Solly Drake (born 1930), American retired Major League Baseball player
 Solly Hemus (born 1923), American retired Major League Baseball player, manager and coach
 Solly Hofman (1882–1956), American Major League Baseball player
 Solomon Joel (1865–1931), English financier who made his fortune in South Africa
 Solly March (born 1994), English footballer
 Solly Sherman (1917–2010), American National Football League quarterback
 Solly Smith (1871–1933), Mexican-American world featherweight boxing champion
 Solly Tyibilika (1979–2011), South African rugby union footballer
 Solly Zuckerman, Baron Zuckerman (1904–1993), British public servant, zoologist and operational research pioneer

Surname
 Chris Solly (born 1991), English footballer
 Edward Solly (1786–1844), English merchant and art collector
 Edward Solly (chemist) (1819–1886), English chemist and antiquary, son of the art collector
 Edward Walter Solly (1882–1966), English cricketer
 Elmer Edward Solly (1945-2007), American convicted of manslaughter, fugitive for 27 years
 George Solly (1855–1930), English cricketer and solicitor
 Henry Solly (1813–1903), English social reformer
 Isaac Solly (1769–1853), London merchant, brother of the art collector Edward Solly
 Jon Solly (born 1963), English former long-distance runner
 Robert Solly (1859–1932), Australian politician

See also
 Sollie (disambiguation)

Lists of people by nickname